Togawa (written: 戸川) is a Japanese surname. Notable people with the surname include:

 (1923–1983), Japanese writer and political commentator
 (born 1961), Japanese singer, musician and actress
 (born 1981), Japanese footballer
 (1933-2016), Japanese singer-songwriter, actress and writer

See also
, train station in Goshogawara, Aomori Prefecture, Japan

Japanese-language surnames